Phạm Quỳnh (December 17, 1892 – September 6, 1945) was a monarchist during the late Nguyễn dynasty and supporter of adhering to traditional Vietnamese customs in the establishment of a constitutional monarchy. He was born near Hanoi, Vietnam, to a literati family of Hải Dương province. He was appointed Minister of Education to the royal court at Huế in 1932, and held several other posts in the court as premier and Minister of the Interior for Emperor Bảo Đại's government. He served as a government minister along with Ngô Đình Diệm under Emperor Bảo Đại's administration. After the August Revolution, he was killed by the Viet Minh along with two other high-ranking members of Bảo Đại's cabinet in September 1945. 
	 	 	 		
Phạm Quỳnh graduated top of his class from the College of the Protectorate in Hanoi and was appointed as an interpreter in the Ecole Francaise d'Extreme-Orient. Phạm Quỳnh dedicated his early years at the school to mastering classical Chinese, and could easily read the Confucian classics which he thought represented the soul of Vietnamese people. In 1913, fellow journalist and collaborator Nguyễn Văn Vĩnh invited him to be an assistant editor to the weekly journal Đông Dương tạp chí (Indochina Magazine). However, the journal’s aggressive pro-French position alienated its prospective readership, and in 1917  Governor-General Albert Sarraut and chief of the Surete Louis Marty decided to sponsor the creation of  Nam Phong (Southern Wind), a new journal with Phạm Quỳnh at the head. Apart from editing Nam Phong, Phạm Quỳnh also wrote for several other French and Vietnamese journals, and authored one of the earliest Quốc ngữ dictionaries.

Nam Phong

Nam Phong (Southern Wind) was a periodical that sought to create a new forum for elite debates surrounding colonial society and was written in Quốc ngữ. Phạm Quỳnh often engaged in heated debates with Nguyễn Văn Vĩnh over the issue of assimilation versus association in their respective journals, Nam Phong and L'Annam Nouveau. However, Nam Phong's political platform was also deemed too pro-French and sycophantic by some, and was often mocked by rival journal Phong Hóa, which was run by members of the Tự-Lực văn-đoàn.

Heritage
On May 28, 2016, the Phạm's Council in Vietnam collaborated with the family of musician Phạm Tuyên held the inauguration ceremony of the tomb restoration work and the erecting of Phạm Quỳnh's statue in Huế City.

The bust of Phạm Quỳnh was designed by his grandson, architect Tôn Thất Đại, is 60 cm tall x 50 cm wide, placed on a pedestal nearly 2 meters high, behind his grave in front of the Vạn Phước pagoda (Trường An Ward, Huế City). 

The front of the tomb is covered with a black stone stele engraved with his famous saying: 

("The Tale of Kieu remains then Our language remains. Our language remains then Our country remains.")

References

External links 

Biography of Phạm Quỳnh
Pháp du hành trình nhật ký, about his travel in France
"Phạm Quỳnh và quá trình tiếp nhận văn hoá phương Tây ở Việt Nam đầu thế kỷ XX", by Vương Trí Nhàn
"Phạm Quỳnh: Người Nặng Lòng Với Tiếng Ta," Phạm Tôn on Phạm Quỳnh
"Về cái ý kiến lập hội 'Chấn hưng quốc học' của ông Phạm Quỳnh", a 1930 article by Phan Khôi
Những uẩn khúc trong cuộc đời ông chủ báo Nam Phong (1)
Những uẩn khúc trong cuộc đời ông chủ báo Nam Phong (2)
Những uẩn khúc trong cuộc đời ông chủ báo Nam Phong (3)
Thông tin về ngày mất của Phạm Quỳnh
A broadcast on Phạm Quỳnh by Thụy Khuê on Radio France Internationale

 

1892 births
1945 deaths
Vietnamese revolutionaries
Vietnamese writers
20th-century executions of Vietnamese people
Nguyen dynasty officials
Government ministers of Vietnam
Assassinated Vietnamese politicians
People from Hanoi
20th-century executions by Vietnam
Vietnamese scholars
Vietnamese journalists